Test Pack (Original title: Test Pack: You're My Baby), is an Indonesian drama and comedy film which directed by Monty Tiwa. The film released on September 6, 2012, and starred by Acha Septriasa, Reza Rahadian, Renata Kusmanto, Dwi Sasono, and Meriam Bellina.

The film was nominated for "Favorite Film", but loses to Habibie & Ainun at the 2013 Indonesian Movie Awards.

Plot
Rahmat (Reza Rahadian), a psychologist who specializes in marriage counseling, and Tata (Acha Septriasa), working in advertising, have been married 7 years without children. While Rahmat is happy with their current life, Tata is set on having children and has made it her number one priority, trying everything from nutrition, fertility calendars, and even sexual positions to reach her goal of having a family. Admitting their difficulties with having a baby, Tata and Rahmat decide to see a doctor (Oon Project Pop) for help. Shinta (Renata Kusmanto), Rahmat's ex-girlfriend, is a supermodel who has broken through and gone international but whose husband, Heru (Dwi Sasono), has divorced because of her infertility. When Rahmat finds that he's infertile, his life with Tata and all that they have built together is in jeopardy. Tata becomes angry and hurt while Rahmat, needing someone to talk to who can understand him, begins spending time with Shinta.

Cast
 Reza Rahadian as Rahmat
 Acha Septriasa as Tata
 Renata Kusmanto as Shinta
 Dwi Sasono as Heru
 Oon Project Pop as Doctor Peni
 Meriam Bellina as Mrs. Sutoyo
 Jaja Mihardja as Mr. Sutoyo
 Gading Marten as Zuki
 Uli Herdinansyah as Markus
 Fitri Sechan as Yani
 Agung Hercules as Ahmad
 Karissa Habibie as Dian
 Ratna Riantiarno as Rahmat' mother

Cameo
 Endhita as Pregnant mother
 Ade Habibie as The photographer

Awards and nominations

References

External links
  Test Pack film synopsis in Cineplex website
  @TEST PACK – Starvision

Indonesian comedy-drama films
Films directed by Monty Tiwa